Anita Sarko (c. 1947 – October 18, 2015) was an American DJ and journalist. She grew up in Detroit, then attended the University of Arizona and graduated from the Michigan State University. She moved to New York City in 1979 and was the DJ in the VIP room at the legendary Mudd Club where she was known for the extraordinarily eclectic array of music she played. In 1983, she began spinning at Danceteria. In 1985, she worked for Studio 54 founder Steve Rubell at the Palladium, becoming the musical mainstay of the Mike Todd room. Later, she became a journalist and wrote for Paper, Interview and Playboy. Sarko committed suicide at the age of 68. She was survived by her husband Erzen Krivca.

References

2015 deaths
American women journalists
American DJs
1940s births
Musicians from Detroit
University of Arizona alumni
Michigan State University alumni
Suicides in the United States
2015 suicides
21st-century American women